Bigbelly was originally a solar powered, trash-compacting bin, manufactured by U.S. company Big belly Solar Inc for use in public spaces such as parks, beaches, amusement parks, universities, retail properties, grocery industry and food service operators. The bin was designed and originally manufactured in Needham, Massachusetts, by Seahorse Power, a company set up in 2003 with the aim of reducing fossil fuel consumption. Due to the bin's commercial success, Seahorse Power changed its name to BigBelly Solar.

Although solar power is still an important feature, the company has since created self-powered stations for use where sun may not be available such as under a convenience store's dispenser canopy and AC powered stations for applications such as corporate cafeterias.

The bin
The bin has a capacity of 567 litres. Its compaction mechanism exerts 5.3kN of force, increasing the bin's effective capacity by five. The compaction mechanism is chain-driven, using no hydraulic fluids. Maintenance consists of lubricating the front door lock annually. The mechanism runs on a standard 12 volt battery, which is kept charged by the solar panel. The battery reserve lasts for approximately three weeks. Wireless technology-enabled units report their status into the CLEAN (Collection, Logistics, Efficiency and Notification system) dashboard that gives waste management and administration insights for monitoring and route optimization. BigBelly Solar also provides companion recycling units that allow cities, parks and universities to collect single-stream or separated recyclable materials in public spaces.

The first machine was installed in Vail, Colorado, in 2004. Other locations to since use the bin include Melbourne, Australia; Seattle, Washington; Cincinnati, Ohio; Boston, Massachusetts; Provincetown, Massachusetts; Quincy, Massachusetts; Chicago, Illinois; Dallas, Texas; El Paso, Texas; Baltimore, Maryland; Philadelphia, Pennsylvania; Ventura, California; Alcalá de Henares, Spain Oakland, California; San Diego, California; San Francisco, California; New York City; Aberystwyth; as well as Amsterdam the Netherlands; Aberdeen, Scotland; London, England; Lower Mainland, Canada; Hamburg, Germany; Münster, Germany; Uppsala, Sweden; Reykjavík, Iceland; Oxford; Prague, Czech Republic; Brno, Czech Republic; Žatec, Czech Republic; Prachatice, Czech Republic; Karlovy Vary, Czech Republic; Brighton and Hove and Lausanne, Switzerland at the Rolex Learning Center, and Spokane, Washington. Some private-sector customers include Prague Zoo, Adidas, Microsoft, Google, Kaiser Permanente, ShopRite, Wegmans, CBRE and Costco.

References

 Solar Compactors Make Mincemeat of Trash, All Things Considered, NPR, July 17, 2007

External links
 BigBellySolar.com - Manufacturer's website

American inventions
Solar-powered devices
Waste treatment technology